Sun Xuliu (born 7 March 1994) is a former professional Chinese tennis player.

On 14 May 2018, she achieved her career-high singles ranking of world No. 384. On 1 May 2017, she peaked at No. 268 in the doubles rankings.

Sun made her WTA Tour main-draw debut in the doubles draw of the 2017 Jiangxi International Open, partnering Zheng Wushuang.

WTA 125 finals

Doubles: 1 (runner-up)

ITF Circuit finals

Singles: 5 (1 title, 4 runner-ups)

Doubles: 16 (5 titles, 11 runner-ups)

External links
 
 

1994 births
Living people
Chinese female tennis players
21st-century Chinese women